"Hell's Bells" is the 16th episode of season 6 of the television series Buffy the Vampire Slayer.

Plot
Buffy and Willow criticize their bright green dresses and talk about Anya and Xander's rehearsal dinner from the night before. It was explained that Anya's friends are circus people, which explains their very odd appearances and surprisingly, the Harris family bought it. Willow has the honor of best man and Buffy, Dawn, and Tara are bridesmaids. Anya hugs both girls in excitement about their gowns, which she of course loves.

Xander tries to get dressed with his family and Anya's demon friends invading his apartment. Xander's parents Tony and Jessica arrive and complain about not being in the wedding pictures and being stuck with the "circus people" on Anya's side. Xander's cousin Carol asks Xander to set her up with Anya's demon friend Kroven. Outside on the streets of Sunnydale, an old man appears out of thin air and walks off, a purpose in mind.

Buffy forces Xander into his cummerbund and works on his bow tie while offering her happy wishes to Xander on his special day. Tara and Willow button Anya into her dress while the bride-to-be rehearses her vows, excitedly talking about how happy she is. Xander's uncle Rory (formerly an unseen character about whom Xander occasionally related anecdotes) shows off his "date" to Dawn, but his date is actually just one of the caterers. D'Hoffryn arrives along with Halfrek and Dawn greets them at the door. D'Hoffryn offers his very alive wedding gift in a box to Dawn.

Dawn continues to mingle through the crowd and encounters Spike with a goth date. Finally ready, Buffy and Xander proceed toward the crowd of mingling guests while discussing how to keep Xander's parents out of trouble. Xander greets people and is suddenly assaulted by people complaining about problems. A drunken Tony offers a toast to the waiting wedding attendees and insults the demons on Anya's side of the "family", which offends them, but Buffy pulls Tony away before a fight can break out between both sides.

The old man in a trench coat drags Xander away from the others and explains that he is Xander Harris from the future, and the wedding cannot take place. As proof, he shows the younger Xander a crystal ball detailing his future: where Xander and Anya have a human son and a part-demon daughter and Anya resents Xander for being an unemployed alcoholic who is too distraught to find work after getting injured in a failed attempt to save Buffy. The visions end as Anya and Xander argue about his behavior and he raises a frying pan at her. Xander, shocked by the visions, is warned by the old man not to marry Anya.

Buffy finds Spike alone and the two talk about the wedding and Spike's attempt to make her jealous with his date. After he finds that his efforts worked, Spike realizes it is best to just leave and takes his date away.

Willow runs into Xander in the kitchen and offers the final "best man" talk then leaves him to practice his vows. Anya continues to go over her vows in front of Tara, who advises against using the term "sex poodle". As the music begins, Buffy arrives to get Anya, but Willow pulls her out of the room and breaks the news that Xander is gone. Stalling while Willow looks for Xander, Buffy uses the excuse that the minister is also a doctor and the ceremony will be delayed while he performs an emergency c-section.

Anya tries her vows one more time while elsewhere, Xander walks away in the rain. His parents head back to the bar, complaining about Anya ruining the wedding. Buffy tries to stall the crowd with charades and juggling as Dawn chats outside with a teenage demon and both compare their embarrassing family and friends. Impatient, Anya heads out towards the wedding crowd, determined to get on with the wedding. The news that Xander is gone is accidentally spilled to Anya as Dawn talks to the demon teen and Anya freaks out.

Tony and other demons begin to argue and then a huge fight breaks out between the two sides of the wedding guests. Tara gets caught up in the battle, but Willow rescues her. Cousin Carol directs Anya to the man in the trench coat and Anya confronts him for scaring Xander off. She finds that he is really a man whom she transformed into a demon many years ago, who now seeks revenge against her. He showed Xander false images about his future to ruin Anya's wedding.

She begins to cry and the demon strikes out at her, prompting Buffy to get involved. Buffy starts to attack the demon and Xander arrives to help save Anya. Anya explains to Xander that he saw only lies in those visions, but Xander is not exactly relieved. After Buffy and Xander finish the demon off and Anya breaks up the fight between the wedding guests, Xander and Anya talk privately before the ceremony. Motivated by the fear of turning into an abusive drunk like his father, Xander refuses to marry Anya as he does not want to ever hurt her in that way. Anya tries to convince him otherwise, but fails, and sadly, the two part ways.

Buffy, Willow and Dawn sit around at the house and feel sorry for both Anya and Xander. As Xander checks into a motel by himself, a devastated Anya sits alone until D'Hoffryn comforts her and offers her job as a vengeance demon back.

References

External links 

 

Buffy the Vampire Slayer (season 6) episodes
2002 American television episodes
Television episodes about weddings